Troy Doris is an American triple jumper of Guyanese descent. He competed at the 2016 Rio de Janeiro Olympics. He finished seventh with a mark of 16.90 meters.

He was born in Chicago to Guyanese parents. He graduated from Bolingbrook High School in Bolingbrook, Illinois in 2007. Doris was a two-time junior college national champion at the College of DuPage before transferring to the University of Iowa.  Before choosing to compete for Guyana, he placed eighth at the 2012 U.S. Olympic Trials in the triple jump.

Doris was Guyana's flag bearer at the 2016 Summer Olympics closing ceremony.

Doris won gold at the 2018 Commonwealth Games in triple jump.

References

1989 births
Living people
Track and field athletes from Chicago
University of Iowa alumni
American male triple jumpers
American sportspeople of Guyanese descent
Guyanese male triple jumpers
Olympic athletes of Guyana
Athletes (track and field) at the 2016 Summer Olympics
Athletes (track and field) at the 2018 Commonwealth Games
Commonwealth Games medallists in athletics
Commonwealth Games gold medallists for Guyana
Competitors at the 2018 Central American and Caribbean Games
World Athletics Championships athletes for Guyana
Olympic male triple jumpers
Commonwealth Games gold medallists in athletics
Medallists at the 2018 Commonwealth Games